The 2019 Stockport Metropolitan Borough Council election took place on 2 May 2019 to elect members of Stockport Metropolitan Borough Council in England. This was on the same day as other local elections. Stockport Council is elected in thirds, which means that in each three member local ward, one councillor is elected every year, except every four years which is classed as a fallow year. The last fallow year was 2017, when no local government elections took place in the borough. Those councillors elected in 2019 will serve a four-year term, expiring in 2023.

Despite Labour drawing level on seats with the Liberal Democrats, with both parties holding 26 councillors, the Labour minority administration continued in office.

Result summary

Election results by ward  
Asterix indicates incumbent in the Ward, and Bold names highlight winning candidate.

Bramhall North

Bramhall South and Woodford

Bredbury and Woodley

Bredbury Green and Romiley

Brinnington and Central

Cheadle and Gatley

Cheadle Hulme North

Cheadle Hulme South

Davenport and Cale Green

Edgeley & Cheadle Heath

Hazel Grove

Heald Green

Heatons North

Heatons South

Manor

Marple North

Marple South and High Lane

Offerton

Reddish North

Reddish South

Stepping Hill

Changes since this election

Hazel Grove

References 

Stockport Metropolitan Borough Council elections
Stockport
May 2019 events in the United Kingdom
2010s in Greater Manchester